WQHQ (104.7 FM) is a radio station broadcasting an adult contemporary format. Licensed to Ocean City, Maryland, United States, the station is owned by iHeartMedia.

References

External links

QHQ
Ocean City, Maryland
IHeartMedia radio stations
Radio stations established in 1965
1965 establishments in Maryland
Mainstream adult contemporary radio stations in the United States